Pattikonda revenue division is an administrative division in the Kurnool district of the Indian state of Andhra Pradesh. It is one of the 3 revenue divisions in this district with 9 mandals under its administration. This division is formed on 4 April 2022.

Mandals 
The mandals in the revenue division include

References

Revenue divisions in Andhra Pradesh